Highline Public Schools (HPS) is a public school district in King County, headquartered in Burien, Washington. As of October 2007, it served 17,331 students and had 997 teachers, and served the cities of Burien, much of Des Moines, Normandy Park, and SeaTac as well as adjacent unincorporated census-designated places proximal to Burien in King County such as White Center and much of Boulevard Park. Portions of Kent and Tukwila and a very small portion of Seattle are in the district limits.

Structure
Highline consists of four main "service areas", Evergreen (the area around White Center), Highline (in Burien), Mount Rainier (mainly Des Moines, but includes parts of Burien), and Tyee (SeaTac), which once represented the district's four high schools. Students in the Highline and Mount Rainier service areas generally attend the area's high school; students in the Evergreen and Tyee service areas attend one of the service area's three small schools. Each service area also contains one middle school which acts as a feeder to the area's high school(s). The four service areas are further divided into separate areas corresponding to the district's elementary schools, which also act as feeders to the area's middle school.

The district's current superintendent is Susan Enfield. The school board consists of five members: Bernie Dorsey (Board President), Michael D. Spear (Vice President), Joe Van, Angelica Alvarez and Tyrone Curry Sr.

History
The district's first school, Highline High School, opened in 1924 in Burien. Evergreen High School (just east of Seattle's "Arbor Heights" neighborhood), Glacier High School, Mount Rainier High School (in Des Moines), and Tyee High School (in SeaTac) were added at later times to compensate for the district's growing population.

During the 1970s, enrollment in the district declined due to the impacts of the Boeing Bust, The Port of Seattle acquiring neighborhoods due to increases in jet noise from Sea-Tac Airport, and levy failures.  Between 1975 and 1980, one high school, five junior high schools, and fourteen elementary schools were closed.  In 1980, the remaining junior high schools were converted into middle schools.
  
In the mid-2000s, Highline commenced a major effort to reverse its schools' declining performance. The most significant aspect of this effort was the conversion of Evergreen and Tyee into three small schools each. Highline and Mount Rainier underwent similar programs, however each remains a single comprehensive high school. In the same time frame, Aviation High School and Highline Big Picture, two specialized schools, opened.

Schools

High schools

Zoned
Evergreen High School (White Center)
Glacier High School 2450 S. 142nd St, Seattle, WA 98168 (defunct 1960-1980)
Highline High School [1] 225 S. 152nd St., Burien, WA 98148 (1924-2019)
Highline High School [2] Burien, WA 98148 (Opening 2021)
Mount Rainier High School (Des Moines)
Olympic Interim High School 615 S. 200th St., Des Moines, WA 98198 (opening 2019)
Satellite Alternative High School 440 S. 186th St, Burien, WA 98148 (defunct 1979-1996)
Tyee High School 4424 S. 188th St., Seattle, WA 98188 (defunct 1963-2005, 2017- )
Tyee Educational Complex (SeaTac) Tyee was split into 3 high schools.(2005-2017 )
 Academy of Citizenship and Empowerment; Tyee Educational Complex
 Global Connections High School; Tyee Educational Complex
 Odyssey – The Essential School; Tyee Educational Complex
Highline Big Picture (SeaTac)
Raisbeck Aviation High School (Tukwila)

Middle schools
Cascade Middle School 11212 10th Ave. SW, Seattle, WA 98146 (1980-  )
Chinook Middle School 18650 42nd Ave S., Seattle, WA 98188 (1980-   )
Glacier Middle School, 2450 S. 142nd St., SeaTac, WA (2019-   )
Pacific Middle School 22705 24th Ave. S., Des Moines, WA 98198 (1980-   )
Sylvester Middle School 16222 Sylvester Rd., Burien, WA 98166 (1980-  )

Junior high schools
Cascade Junior High 11212 10th Ave. SW, Seattle, WA 98146 (defunct 1957-1980)
Chinook Junior High 18650 42nd Ave. S., Seattle, WA 98188 (defunct 1957-1980) 
Glendale Junior High 1201 S 104th St, Seattle, WA 98168 (defunct 1963-1978)
Olympic Junior High 615 S 200th St, Des Moines, WA 98198 (defunct 1955-1979)
Pacific Junior High 22705 24th Ave. S., Des Moines, WA 98198 (Defunct 1960-1980)
Puget Sound Junior High 135 SW 126th St., Seattle, WA 98146 (defunct 1949-1981)
Seahurst Junior High 14603 14th Ave SW, Burien, WA 98166 (defunct 1960-1976)
Sunset Junior High 1809 S 140th St, Seattle, WA 98168 (defunct 1957-1975)
Sylvester Junior High School 16222 Sylvester Rd., Burien, WA 98166 (defunct 1953-1980)

Elementary schools
Angle Lake Elementary 19215 - 28th Ave. S., Seattle, WA 98188 (defunct 1928-1975)
Beverly Park Elementary [1] 11427 - 3rd Ave. S., Seattle, WA 98168 (defunct 1950-1992)
Beverly Park Elementary [2] 1201 S. 104th St., Seattle, WA 98168 (Formerly Glendale Jr. High)(1992-    )
Boulevard Park Elementary 12833 20th Ave S, Seattle, WA 98166 (defunct 1937-1980)
Bow Lake Elementary School (SeaTac)
Burien Heights Elementary, 1210 SW 136th St., Burien, WA 98146 (defunct 1955-1975)
Cedarhurst Elementary School (Burien)
Chelsea Park Elementary 425 SW 144th St., Burien, WA 98166 (defunct 1948-1976)
Crestview Elementary 16200 42nd Ave. S, Seattle, WA 98188 (defunct 1958-1976)
Des Moines Elementary School [1] 22001 9th Ave. S., Des Moines, WA 98198 (defunct 1925-2019)
Des Moines Elementary School [2] 23801 16th Ave. S., Des Moines, WA 98198 (Opening in 2019)
Gregory Heights Elementary (Burien)
Hazel Valley Elementary (Burien)
Hilltop Elementary School (Unincorporated area)
Lake Burien Elementary 14660 18th Ave. SW, Burien, WA 98166 (defunct 1926-1976)
Lakeview Elementary 15820 6th Ave. SW, Burien, WA 98166 (defunct 1955-1975)
Madrona Elementary School [1] 3030 S. 204th St. Seattle, WA 98198 (defunct 1959-2003)
Madrona Elementary School [2] 20301 32nd Ave. S., SeaTac, WA 98198 (opened in 2004)
Manhattan Elementary 440 S. 186th St, Seattle, WA 98148 (defunct 1960-1979)
Marvista Elementary School (Normandy Park)
Maywood Elementary School 1410 S. 200th St, Seattle, WA 98198 (defunct 1958-1975)
McMicken Heights Elementary School (SeaTac)
Midway Elementary School (Des Moines)
Mount View Elementary School (White Center)
Normandy Park Elementary 801 SW 174th St, Normandy Park, WA 98166 (defunct 1954-1981)
North Hill Elementary School (Des Moines)
Olympic Elementary @ Olympic 615 S 200th St., Des Moines, WA 98198 (defunct 1979-2005)
Parkside Elementary School (Des Moines)
Riverton Heights Elementary 3011 S. 148th St, Seattle, WA 98168 (defunct 1953-1998)
Salmon Creek Elementary 614 SW 120th St, Seattle, WA 98146 (defunct 1958-2005)
Seahurst Elementary School [1] 14603 14th Ave SW, Burien, WA 98166 Burien, WA (defunct 1976-1991)
Seahurst Elementary School [2] 14603 14th Ave. S.W., Burien, WA 98166 (1992-    )
Shorewood Elementary School (Burien)
Southern Heights Elementary School (Unincorporated area)
Sunnydale Elementary 15631 8th Ave S, Burien, WA (defunct 1904-1938; 1939-1981; 1989-2005)
Sunny Terrace Elementary 1010 S 146th St, Burien, WA 98168 (defunct 1960-1976)
White Center Heights Elementary School (White Center)
Valley View Elementary 17622 46th Ave S., SeaTac, WA 98188 (defunct 1969-2007)

Other facilities
 Occupational Skills Center (OSC) 1968-2007: 18010 8th Ave S., Burien 98148 
Puget Sound Skills Center (PSSC) 2007–Present:  18010 8th Ave. S., Burien 98148 
 Woodside School 1958-1988 (defunct): 18367 8th Ave. S., Burien 98148

References

External links

Highline Public Schools
Highline Historical Society
Glacier High School 2014
Highline High School 2014 & 2019

 
School districts in Washington (state)
School districts established in 1924
Education in King County, Washington
Burien, Washington
SeaTac, Washington
1924 establishments in Washington (state)
Seattle